Sally in Our Alley may refer to:

  Sally in Our Alley (song), a 1725 song by Henry Carey
 Sally in Our Alley (1902 musical), a 1902 Broadway musical
 Sally in Our Alley (1916 film), a 1916 British silent film directed by Laurence Trimble
 Sally in Our Alley (1927 film), a 1927 American silent film directed by Walter Lang
 Sally in Our Alley (1931 film), a 1931 British film directed by Maurice Elvey